The Dr. A. E. and Phila Jane Rockey House, also known as Rockholm, in the outskirts of Portland, Oregon was built in 1913.  It was listed on the National Register of Historic Places in 1985.

It was designed by architect Folger Johnson.

References

1913 establishments in Oregon
Houses completed in 1913
Multnomah County, Oregon
Houses on the National Register of Historic Places in Portland, Oregon